The CPC and World Political Parties Summit was an international relations video conference between various international political parties, including both governing and non-governing parties, held on 6 July 2021. It was chaired by Xi Jinping, general secretary of the Chinese Communist Party. The summit involved representatives from 500 political parties across 160 countries and over 10,000 party representatives. The theme of the summit was "For the People's Wellbeing: The Responsibility of Political Parties".

Background 
The Summit was organized by the International Liaison Department of the Chinese Communist Party. The department, which is tasked with building relationships with political parties internationally, has had its profile increase during the Xi era. In 2014, the department launched a series of annual dialogues in an effort to promote "China's story" to foreign elites. The department has also held a series of themed dialogues with foreign political parties, such as a dialogue organized around the 200th birthday of Karl Marx, and an African dialogue in 2018. The latter brought together leaders of political parties from over forty African countries.

The department developed the CPC and the World Political Parties Summit as a formal follow-up to these recent efforts.

Proceedings 
The summit followed days after the 100th Anniversary of the Chinese Communist Party. International Liaison Department Vice Minister Guo Yezhou stated that the Summit's purpose was to "help the international community adjust more quickly to the rise of China," and for the Chinese government to increase its "understanding, support, and companionship" from other nations. 

More than twenty heads of state from developing countries made speeches congratulating the party on its one-hundredth anniversary, some of them thanking China for the masks and vaccines provided for COVID-19 response efforts. Xi Jinping and the host of the summit, thanked national and international political party representatives who sent well wishes for the party's anniversary. He called on political parties worldwide to shoulder historic responsibility for the pursuit of the people's wellbeing and progress of mankind. He also renewed a call to work towards building a community with a shared future for mankind, and voiced rejection towards technology blockades, developmental decoupling, as well as unilateralism, hegemony, and power politics. Xi stated that China's modernization demonstrated that the Chinese model was a viable alternative to Western modes of development and that China was willing to share its experience with other countries.

Participating political parties
The following is an incomplete list of major attendees:

George Papandreou, president of the Socialist International, was also in attendance. S. Senthilkumar, member of the Lok Sabha in India, was in attendance. Romano Prodi, former Italian prime minister, was in attendance.

See also 
 Foreign relations of China

References

2021 conferences
2021 in international relations
21st-century diplomatic conferences
Diplomatic conferences in China
2021 in China
Xi Jinping